Ex Fighting is a 2014 Chinese comedy romance film directed by Lu Yang. It was released on October 14.

Cast
Andrew Lin
Xiong Naijin
Ma Yuan
Zhu Dan
Liu Yun
Lam Suet
Wang Haizhen

Reception
By October 20, the film had earned ¥0.40 million at the Chinese box office.

References

2014 romantic comedy films
Chinese romantic comedy films